The Embassy of Tajikistan in London is the diplomatic mission of Tajikistan in the United Kingdom, located in the Notting Hill district.

References

External links
Official site

Tajikistan
London
Tajikistan–United Kingdom relations